Yury Ivanavich Maleyew (born 20 March 1968 in Bykhaw) is a Belarusian professional football coach and former player. From 2010 till 2013 he was a manager of Slavia Mozyr.

Playing career
Maleyew played for Dnepr Mogilev and Torpedo Zhodino in the Belarusian Premier League and Zawisza Bydgoszcz the Polish Ekstraklasa. He also made nine appearances for the Belarus national football team.

Honours
MPKC Mozyr
Belarusian Premier League champion: 1996

References

External links
 
 Profile at KLISF
 

1968 births
Living people
Belarusian footballers
Expatriate footballers in Poland
Belarusian expatriate footballers
Belarusian expatriate sportspeople in Poland
Belarus international footballers
FC Dinamo Minsk players
FC Dnepr Mogilev players
FC Dynamo Brest players
Zawisza Bydgoszcz players
FC Ataka Minsk players
FC Slavia Mozyr players
FC Torpedo Minsk players
FC Torpedo-BelAZ Zhodino players
Belarusian football managers
FC Torpedo Zhodino managers
FC SKVICH Minsk managers
FC Slavia Mozyr managers
Association football midfielders